At Point Blank is a 2003 Swedish action film. It stars Mikael Persbrandt, Stina Ekblad, Sofia Helin and Peter Franzén.

Plot
The film involves a skillful team of professional thieves who hit several banks in Stockholm. The police investigation is led by 33-year-old chief inspector Klara (Sofia Helin) and Greger Krona (Stefan Sauk) who are led to the source, with a fatal exit.

Klara, a chief inspector of the Stockholm robbery commission, is in love with Frank (Mikael Persbrandt), a surgeon for Doctors Without Borders. The story opens during a bank robbery unlike any in Swedish history, carried out with military professionalism.

The thieves disappear with the money, and their escape car is found burning in a forest. Heavily-armed police surround the forest. Suddenly, one of the robbers starts shooting a police helicopter searching the forest, providing cover for the robbers so they have time to escape.

Klara and her colleague, Krona soon realize that they are not dealing with ordinary bank robbers. The thieves have information on bank delivery times, police work, safety, and their behavior is extreme. The hunt is intense, the villains' methods becoming frighteningly more sophisticated.

Cast
Mikael Persbrandt as Frank
Sofia Helin as Klara
Stefan Sauk as Greger Krona
Stina Ekblad as Marianne
Peter Franzén as Juha/Jarkko
Jarmo Mäkinen as Raimo
Steve Aalam as Tommy
Stina Zacco as Eva
Stig Engström as Ingmar Hjälm
Irma Schultz as Jeanette Hjälm
Simon Averin-Markström as Johan Hjälm
Jens Hultén as Response Force officer Mattsson

External links
 
 

2003 films
2003 action films
Films set in Sweden
Swedish action films
2000s Swedish films